Dimensions is a database of research grants, which links grants to resulting publications, clinical trials and patents. Dimensions is part of Digital Science (or Digital Science & Research Solutions Ltd) a technology company with its headquarters in London, United Kingdom. The company focuses on strategic investments into startup companies that support the research lifecycle.

Two studies published in 2021 compared Dimensions with its subscription-based commercial competitors, and both concluded that Dimensions.io provided broader temporal and publication source coverage than Scopus and Web of Science in most subject areas, and that Dimensions was closer in its coverage to free aggregation databases, such as The Lens and Google Scholar. As of October 2021, Dimensions.ai covers nearly 106 million publications with over 1.2 billion citations.

References

External links 
 Dimensions official website

Bibliographic databases and indexes
Scholarly search services
Online databases
Citation indices